Biars-sur-Cère (literally Biars on Cère; Lengadocian: Biard de Sera) is a commune in the Lot department located in southwestern France. It is the site of the headquarters of Andros, whose brands include Bonne Maman.

During World War II, Biars-sur-Cère villagers hid a number of Jews from Nazi persecution. It has been reported but not verified that among the families protecting Jews was the Chapoulart family who later founded Andros.

Population

See also
Communes of the Lot department

References

Communes of Lot (department)